Walter Melon is a 1997 animated TV show, very loosely adapted from the Franco-Belgian comic Achille Talon.

A co-production between Saban International Paris, ARD/Degeto, France 2 and Scottish Television Enterprises with the participation of Canal+, Walter Melon and aired in the United States on Fox Family from 1998 to 1999. In the UK the series was broadcast on CITV (via Scottish Television), and later reran on Fox Kids.  Each episode consists of two shorter adventures, and a total of 52 episodes were produced. Ownership of the series passed to Disney in 2001 when Disney acquired Fox Kids Worldwide, which also includes Saban Entertainment. The series is not available on Disney+.

Plot
Walter Melon and his assistant Bitterbug run a company as "heroes for hire". Whenever people get in trouble, go missing, or fall victim to a villains' latest scheme, Melon and Bitterbug (Lefuneste) take their places temporarily. In the show, Walter and Bitterbug replaced spoofs of characters from pop culture such as Superman, Batman, Spider-Man, Hulk, James Bond, Indiana Jones, Kirk and Spock, Luke Skywalker and Han Solo, Tarzan, Mad Max, two of the Power Rangers, Jason Lee Scott and Billy Cranston, the Terminator, Fox Mulder, John Rambo, Little Red Riding Hood, Aladdin, Pinocchio and Jiminy Cricket, Dr. Alan Grant, Marty McFly, Hercules and Casper the Friendly Ghost. Unlike most heroes, Walter is a dim-witted, overweight jolly French American time traveler with a large melon-shaped nose and a lot of luck, but nobody ever notices the apparent change in appearance, with his character's apparent weight gain merely being commented on immediately after his arrival and subsequently ignored (such as asking if Robocop had too much oil or D'artagnan accidentally swallowed a bell at Notre-Dame). When he impersonates the heroes, he fights Sneero (le méchant), the main antagonist of the series who represents the main villain of the parody universe. Additionally, Walter is sometimes partnered with Amelia, a woman who represents the heroines, token female characters, female sidekicks, and love interests of the story.
In the second season in order to make the show educational, Walter and Bitterbug would receive cross-time distress messages from historical figures such as George Washington, Christopher Columbus, Marco Polo, Thomas Edison, Lewis and Clark, Georges Méliès, and the Apollo 11 astronauts, rather than fictional characters, unlike the first season.

The series was available on Jetix Play, but is not currently available through any other outlet, although many of the episodes are available on YouTube to view.

Episodes

Season One
 "Marzipan the Apeman/Goldrod"
 "The Melon Strikes Back/The Glob"
 "Star Blecch/Splatman and Rubin"
 "The Mark of Zero/Windiana Bones and the Temp of Doom"
 "Molasses Park/Superguy"
 "The Far Out Flower Rangers/Dobin Wood"
 "Groggy XII/Peter Pun"
 "Mutiny on the Bouncy/Moperminator"
 "Big Red Riding Hood and the Pizzas/The Stout Musketeer"
 "Melon Impossible/Robomelon
 "The Incredible Bulk/Noman The Barbarian"
 "A Fistful of Melon/Melon in Blunderland"
 "Whambo/Gums"
 "The Hard Labours of Hercules/The Hound of the Basketvilles"
 "Back to Melon's Blundering Future/New Age Pizza Lovin' Tae Kwon Do Tortoises"
 "Incompetence Day/King-Gong"
 "Ben Hurdy-Gurdy/The Jungle Schnook"
 "Frank & Stein/The Derisible Man"
 "Shalien/Dance A Lot"
 "T.E.T. The Temporary Extraterrestrial/Arachnoman"
 "Squashymodo/Walter, The Jolly Ghost"
 "Top Fun/Gnocchio"
 "Melon of Snoz/Fat Max - The Roo's Revenge"
 "The Vampire Bites Back/Christopher Columsy"
 "Hex Files/Kerazy Kid"
 "Dr. Jiggle and Mr. Snide/Palladin & The Capricious Lamp"

Season Two
 "Walter XIV, The Fun King/Melon on the Mountain"
 "Houston, the Melon has Landed/Walterius Caesar"
 "Attila, the Melon/Melon Takes Flight"
 "Vini Vici Da Vinci/Go West Young Melon"
 "Ponce de Melon/Rough Rider Melon"
 "Melon at the O.K. Corral/Melon Lights the Way"
 "You Reykjavik and I’ll Rake Mine/Caveman for Hire"
 "Charlemagne/King Walter, The Melon-Hearted"
 "And Yet It Make Your Head Spin/Melon of Liberty"
 "Maestro Melon/Johan Melonberg"
 "Hot Air Melon/Sir Francis Melon"
 "Francisco Vasquez Melon de Colonado/Samurai Melon"
 "Walter Casanova, Lady Killer/Walter Picasso"
 "A Napoleon With Melon on Top/Hula Hula Melon"
 "Serf-City Serfitude/Walter Crockett"
 "The 7th Melon of the World/Queen Elizabeth I & Sir Walter Melon"
 "Alexander the Greatest/Alexander Graham Melon"
 "Marathon Melon/It's Melon by George"
 "Melon of Arabia/Chicken Curie with Melon"
 "Melon, I Presume/Walter Melonbal"
 "Walter Hears Voices/There's a Trick in It"
 "Once Upon a Melon/You're Driving Me Crazy"
 "Melon of the Amazon/Melon, Heal Thyself"
 "Pasteurized Melon/Walter Vidocq-The Adventurer With The Big Heart"
 "Walter Desmoulins, Hero of French Revolution/Mephisneereles"
 "E=Melon2 / That's Usin' Your Noodle, Walter Polo"

Cast
 Richard Bell - Walter Melon
 Jeremiah Nagle - Bitterbug (season 1)
 Samuel Vincent - Bitterbug (season 2)
 Michael McConnohie - Sneero (season 1)
 Lee Tockar - Sneero (season 2)
 Francine Elcar - Amelia

Crew
 Bruno Bianchi - Director & Producer
 Jaxqueline Tordjman, Vincent Chalvon-Demersay, Sandy Ross -  Executive Producers
 Jamie Simone - Casting & Voice Director
 Micheal Dax - Music 
 Natalie Altmann -  Script editor

References

External links
 "Retrojunk on Walter Melon" on Retrojunk.com
 

1990s American animated television series
1997 American television series debuts
1998 American television series endings
1990s French animated television series
1997 French television series debuts
1998 French television series endings
American children's animated adventure television series
American children's animated comedy television series
American time travel television series
Canal+ original programming
Fox Kids
French children's animated adventure television series
French children's animated comedy television series
French time travel television series
Fox Family Channel original programming
Television series based on Belgian comics
Television series by Saban Entertainment
Television shows produced by Scottish Television